The 2022–23 Northern Kentucky Norse men's basketball team represented Northern Kentucky University in the 2022–23 NCAA Division I men's basketball season. The Norse were led by fourth-year head coach Darrin Horn, and played their home games at Truist Arena in Highland Heights, Kentucky as members of the Horizon League.

Previous season
The Norse finished the 2021–22 season 20–12, 14–6 in Horizon League play to finish in third place. In the Horizon League tournament, they defeated Detroit Mercy and Purdue Fort Wayne, before falling to Wright State in the championship game.

Roster

Schedule and results

|-
!colspan=12 style=""| Exhibition

|-
!colspan=12 style=""| Regular season

|-
!colspan=12 style=| Horizon League tournament

|-
!colspan=9 style=|NCAA tournament

Sources

References

Northern Kentucky Norse men's basketball seasons
Northern Kentucky
Northern Kentucky Norse men's basketball
Northern Kentucky Norse men's basketball
Northern Kentucky